Emperor Alexius or Alexis may refer to:

 Alexios I Komnenos (1048–1118), Byzantine emperor
 Alexios II Komnenos (1169–1183), Byzantine emperor
 Alexios III Angelos (1153–1211), Byzantine emperor
 Alexios IV Angelos (1182–1204), Byzantine emperor
 Alexios V (died 1205), Alexios Doukas Mourtzouphlos, Byzantine emperor
 Alexios I of Trebizond (1182–1222)
 Alexios II of Trebizond (1282–1330)
 Alexios III of Trebizond (1338–1390)
 Alexios IV of Trebizond (1382–1429)
 Alexis I of Russia (1629–1676), Alexei Mikhailovich Romanov